Crina Elena Pintea (née Ailincăi; born 3 April 1990) is a Romanian professional handballer who plays as a pivot for CSM București and the Romanian national team.

Considered to be one of the best pivots in the world, in 2019 she was named to the EHF Champions League All-Star Team. In 2018, she was named to the European Championship All-Star Team. Pintea is also regarded by many as one of the best defenders in the world. In recognition of her performances and achievements throughout the year, she was also voted the Romanian Handballer of the Year in 2019.

Early life
Born in Bacău County, in the village of Podu Turcului, she is the oldest of four children. She did not practice seriously any sport until age 16.

Career
Pintea moved to Râmnicu Vâlcea at the age of sixteen and began her career at Oltchim Râmnicu Vâlcea before signing for HC Zalău from the academy at the Centrul Național Olimpic de Excelență Râmnicu Vâlcea (CNOE Râmnicu Vâlcea) in 2009 by Gheorghe Tadici. She was also the runner-up of the 2011–12 EHF Cup competition. In October 2015, following a lengthy dispute over a new contract, she was signed by Thüringer HC. She then went on to help THC win Bundesliga title in the 2015–16 season, and the DHB-Supercup next season as well. A year later, Pintea signed for Paris 92 in France where she was named in the Championnat de France Team of the Year for season 2017–18. She joined Győri Audi ETO KC under Ambros Martín's leadership, and helped the club win treble in 2018–19. Győr allowed Crina Pintea to leave the club at the end of the season, honouring a gentlemen's agreement. In the summer 2019, CSM București announced that they have signed Pintea after only half a year with ETO.

Pintea made her senior debut for Romania in September 2012 after previously being capped by Romania youth team at under-19 level. She was chosen in Romania's squads for the 2013, 2015 and 2017 IHF World Championships and EHF Euro 2012, 2014, 2016 and 2018.

Achievements
National team
IHF World Championship:
Bronze Medalist: 2015

European Competitions
EHF Champions League:
Winner: 2019
EHF Cup:
Finalist: 2012

Domestic Competitions
Romanian National League:
Bronze Medalist: 2015
Supercupa României:
Finalist: 2011
Bundesliga:
Winner: 2016
DHB-Supercup:
Winner: 2016
Hungarian Championship
Winner: 2019, 2022
Hungarian Cup:
Winner: 2019

Individual awards
 Championnat de France Best Pivot: 2018
 Carpathian Trophy Best Defender: 2018
 All-Star Pivot of the European Championship: 2018 
 TV 2 Norway All-Star Pivot of the European Championship: 2018
 Handball-Planet.com All-Star Pivot: 2018
 All-Star Pivot of the EHF Champions League: 2019
 Carpathian Trophy MVP: 2019
 Supercupa României MVP: 2019
 Romanian Handballer of the Year: 2019

References

External links

People from Bacău County
1990 births
Living people
Romanian female handball players
Expatriate handball players
Romanian expatriate sportspeople in France
Romanian expatriate sportspeople in Germany
Romanian expatriate sportspeople in Hungary
Győri Audi ETO KC players